Sydney [Sam] Alexander Wakefield  (13 May 1927 - 22 August 2009) was an Australian writer. He was best known for the Bottersnikes and Gumbles series of children's books.

Biography
Sydney Wakefield was born in Australia to English immigrant parents on 13 May 1927. In 1945 he enlisted and was commissioned into the 2nd Punjab Regiment. After the end of World War II he joined his father who had an orchard Gosford, New South Wales. After studying Social Studies at Sydney University (1949–50), he married (1953), and started a farm at Kariong, New South Wales.

He wrote short stories for children about "Bottersnikes and Gumbles", which contain a mixture of absurdity, humour, puns, as well as carrying an environmental message.

Works
Wakefield wrote four books about the Bottersnikes and Gumbles:
 , 80pp 
 , 88pp
 , 96pp
 , 84pp

Other

In 1996 the four books were reissued in an omnibus volume under the title The Complete Tales of Bottersnikes and Gumbles.

References

Sources

1927 births
Australian children's writers
2009 deaths
Australian male short story writers